Benjamin Brierley (born 20 December 1986) is a German international rugby union player, having last played for the Ampthill RUFC in the National League 3 Midlands and the German national rugby union team.

He has played rugby since 1980. Brierley, born in England, qualified to play for Germany because he spent the necessary number of years playing in the country, for SC 1880 Frankfurt. He returned to his home country after the 2008–09 season, having won a number of titles with Frankfurt. At the end of the 2009-10 season, where he was unable to play many games because of study commitments, Brierley decided to return to Germany, if able to find employment there.

He made his debut for Germany against Georgia on 7 February 2009 and was player of the year in the World Cup Qualifier games.

Honours

Club
 German rugby union championship
 Champions: 2008, 2009
 Runners up: 2007
 German rugby union cup
 Winners: 2007, 2009

Stats
Benjamin Brierley's personal statistics in club and international rugby:

Club

 As of 23 March 2010

National team

European Nations Cup

Friendlies & other competitions

 As of 23 March 2010

References

External links
 Benjamin Brierley at scrum.com
   Benjamin Brierley at totalrugby.de

1986 births
Living people
Alumni of Loughborough University
English rugby union players
German rugby union players
Naturalized citizens of Germany
Germany international rugby union players
Rugby union players from Devizes
Rugby union wings
SC 1880 Frankfurt players
English expatriate sportspeople in Germany
English expatriate rugby union players
Expatriate rugby union players in Germany